Wilbur-By-The-Sea is an unincorporated community in Volusia County, Florida, United States. It is one of the two unincorporated areas in Volusia County along the coast that does not have a condominium or hotel (the other being Highbridge); instead, the area uses beachfront homes. Tom Wilbur Bay is a body of water that only has docks on the east side of the bay. The major roads of the area are State Road 441 and CR 4075; both roads border a body of water, Peninsula Drive on the west and South Atlantic Avenue on the east.

See also
Atlantic Ocean
Halifax River

References

Unincorporated communities in Volusia County, Florida
Unincorporated communities in Florida
Populated coastal places in Florida on the Atlantic Ocean
Beaches of Volusia County, Florida
Beaches of Florida